Sal'it (lit. Wheatear) is an Israeli settlement organized as a moshav in the West Bank. Located around eight kilometres south of the Palestinian city of Tulkarm, it falls under the jurisdiction of Shomron Regional Council.

The international community considers Israeli settlements in the West Bank illegal under international law, but the Israeli government disputes this.

History
The village was established in 1979 by the Mishkei Herut Beitar movement.

References

External links
Official website 

Moshavim
Israeli settlements in the West Bank
Populated places established in 1979
1979 establishments in the Israeli Military Governorate